Calcutta Youth Choir was set up in 1958 by Ruma Guha Thakurta with Salil Chowdhury and Satyajit Ray.

Calcutta Youth Choir is known for their performance of folk and mass songs. Several years ago, the choir broke out with the song 'Aaj joto juddhabaaj'. Shibdas Bandopadhyay wrote the words and V. Balsara composed the music. The songs performed by choir under the direction of Ruma Guha Thakurta widely includes song of Dwijendralal Ray, Rabindranath Tagore, Rajanikanta Sen, Nazrul Islam, Prem Dhawan, Sudhin Dasgupta, Salil Chowdhury and Sibdas Banerjee.

History
In the year, July, 1974 20-member folk song and dance troupe of Calcutta Youth Choir led by Ruma Guha Thakurta, won the first prize in the Copenhagen Youth Festival. The choir also took part in the 25th anniversary of Independence Day of India in Delhi. Opening song by Calcutta Youth Choir to welcome Nelson Mandela in India in 1990 and to honour Amartya Sen for Nobel in the year 1998, 21 June 2007 performing for 30 years Communist Party of India (Marxist) (CPI(M)) in West Bengal  are the Laurels. More than 5000 shows have been performed by the choir led by Ruma Guha Thakurta. There are more than 300 members in the choir involved in various activities like singing, dancing, playing musical instruments, management, etc. 3 December 1994, Calcutta Youth Choir celebrated its 36th anniversary to celebrate 50 years of Ruma Guha Thakurta's association with music, dance and cinema where sitting chief minister of West Bengal Jyoti Basu, Bijoya Ray (wife of Late Satyajit Ray), Buddhadeb Bhattacharya, singer Usha Uthup, Amit Kumar and many other legend were present.  In spite of her major heart attack since 2004 Ruma Guhathakurta is still regularly performing. This is the only leading choir troupe of Calcutta performing continuously for the last 55 years.

Former chief minister of West Bengal Buddhadeb Bhattacharya inaugurated the new building of the choir in South Calcutta on 29 December 2006.

2 May 2008 in the birthday of Satyajit Ray, Calcutta Youth Choir celebrated 50 years anniversary at Rabindrasadan, Kolkata in presence of Manna Dey, sitting speaker of Parliament Somenath Chatterjee, Sabita Chowdury, Mayor of Kolkata Bikash Bhattacharia, Suchitra Mitra and others. Manna Dey and Sabita Chowdury participated in the song Janeywaleey Sipahi under the direction of Ruma Guha Thakurta.

16 September 2010, choir celebrated its 52nd anniversary where 6 members of Calcutta Youth Choir were honoured for performing regularly with the choir for more than 50 years by Ruma Guha Thakurta.

9 April 2012, choir celebrated its 54th anniversary of Calcutta Youth Choir headed by Ruma Guha Thakurta. This was the last show Guha Thakurta was present and conducted the show.

11 June 2013, choir celebrated its 55th anniversary of Calcutta Youth Choir. For the first time Ruma Guha Thakurta was not present in the Annual Show due to her deteriorating health condition.

27 January 2013, the choir hosted a Dance and Music Festival held at the Uttarpara Jaikrishna Ground. This event showcased the true culture of Bengali music accompanied with folk dance. 
5 May 2013, the choir performed a collection of patriotic songs at the Gitanjali Stadium. 
23 January 2014, the choir made their next appearance at the Mother Teresa International Award Ceremony and performed various folk songs to keep the audience and dignitaries entertained.  
In May 2014, they also performed hit numbers at Pete Seeger's Tribute Concert at the Tollygunge Club. 
On 4 July and 17 October 2014 the choir performed in St. James’ School and on both the occasions and performed their trademark folk and mass songs. 
8 January 2015, the choir performed at Bhantala High School and entertained the crowd with their enthralling music. 
On 12 September 2015, the Calcutta Youth choir performed at the Golden Jubilee Celebration of Naragole Raj College in Midnapur. 
In July 2016, the choir performed at Rabindra Sadan to celebrate the birth anniversary of D.L. Roy, Atul Prasad Sen and Rajani Ratan Sen. 
On 30 December 2016, the Calcutta Youth Choir performed in a Sangeet Anusthan held in the district of Hedua. 
The Calcutta Youth Choir has performed at the Bangla Sangeet Mela organised by the Govt. of West Bengal on several occasions: 
9 April 2013, the choir participated in the Bangla Sangeet Mela held at the Rabitirtha Hall in Newtown. 
In February 2014, 17 February 2015 and 18 December 2016 the choir yet again performed at the historic Bangla Sangeet Mela organised by the Govt. of West Bengal and held at Rabindra Sadan.  
19 July 2015, the choir performed to celebrate the birth anniversary of D.L. Roy and Atul Prasad Sen at Rabindra Sadan.

Albums by Calcutta Youth Choir
 Beje Uthlo Ki Somoyer Ghori, A collection of mass songs released by HMV in 1976
 Waqt Ki Awaz (Hindi), A collection of modern songs released by HMV
 Prarthna Sangeet, A collection of devotional songs released by CBS
 All times Great Calcutta Youth Choir, A collection of selected track from HMV
 Amra Tori Beye Jai, A collection of mass songs released by HMV in 1981
 Manusher Gaan Gai, A collection of mass songs released by HMV in 1982
 Pochis Bochor Dhore, Released by HMV in the year 1983 on 25th anniversary of the choir
 Bharatbarsho Surger Ek Naam, A collection of Bengali modern songs released by HMV
 Swadesi Juger Gaan, a collection of patriotic songs released by HMV
 Chetonar Gaan, A collection of songs to welcome Nelson Mandela in India released by CBS in 1988
 Besh Sotoker Gaan, A collection of Bengali mass songs released by Hindustan Records in 1990 celebrating 300th birthday of Calcutta
 Deshatobodok Gaan, A collection of patriotic songs released by Gathani in 1993
 Din Agato Oi, A collection of modern songs released by Gathani in 1994 for the celebration of Bengali New Year (1400 SATABDI)
 Kadam Kadam Badaye Ja (Hindi), A collection of INA (Azad Hind Fauj) songs by HMV n 100th birth anniversary of Netaji Subhas Bose in 1996
 Mile Sobe Bharat Santan, A collection of modern songs released by HMV in 1998
 Sikol Bhangar Gaan, A collection of Patriotic songs (before India's Independence) released in 2001
 Amader Salilda, A collection of mass songs by Salil Chowdhury released by ASHA AUDIO in 2007
 Ek Dor Mein, A collection of Hindi Translation Rabindra Sangeet released by Saregama(HMV) in 2010

References

External links
 Calcutta Youth Choir, performances

Indian musical groups
Choirs of children
Youth choirs
Musical groups established in 1958
Culture of West Bengal
Culture of Kolkata
Bengali music
Indian choirs
1958 establishments in West Bengal